Carlos Eduardo Fierro Guerrero (born 24 July 1994) is a Mexican professional footballer who plays as a winger.

Fierro was part of the Mexico U-17 FIFA World Cup champions in 2011, becoming the first national team to achieve it while hosting, defeating Uruguay 2–0 in the final and winning their second title. With 4 goals, his performance in the tournament was recognized by being awarded the Adidas Bronze Ball.

Early life
Fierro was born on 24 July 1994 in Ahome, Sinaloa. His mother, Irma Guerrero, has always been very involved with her son's career; little is known about Fierro's father. He had one older brother, Gustavo Iván Fierro Guerrero who passed in 2011 due to cancer. At the age of four, Fierro started playing football for a club subsidiary of Guadalajara in Sinaloa, coached by Bernardo Chico Vonn. Fierro's brother Gustavo had left to Jalisco in 2007 to try his luck with C.D. Guadalajara, so in 2008, Fierro followed his footsteps to try to make it in Mexico's most beloved club. Fierro and his brother seemed to have reached their goal, Carlos playing for the youth squads of Guadalajara and Gustavo for its second division team.
Gustavo was diagnosed with cancer and returned to Sinaloa leaving Carlos by himself in the capital of the state of Jalisco, all seemed as if Fierro would have to return to Sinaloa as well, but the family of Giovani Casillas, who also played for the youth teams of Guadalajara practically, adopted Carlos in order to support his dreams of being a football player.

Club career

Guadalajara

2011–14
Fierro made his senior team debut as a substitute on August 20, 2011, in a match against Monterrey coming in for Omar Arellano at the 76th minute. He was the most used substitute in the Apertura 2011 coming in as a sub on eight occasions. He was named to be in the initial line-up in the Copa Libertadores 2011 as a starter against Deportivo Quito, thus scoring his first official goal with the senior team in all competitions.  The first time he completed an entire game was in week six of the Clausura 2012 when they were defeated by Monterrey. The tournament in which he managed to accumulate the most minutes was in the Clausura 2014, totaling 1,286 minutes with 16 caps. He suffered from an injury in the start of the Clausura 2014 and on another in mid-season, this affected Guadalajara as they had 9 players injured midway through the Clausura 2014.

2014–15 season

From the beginning of Liga MX and Copa MX Apertura 2014, Fierro has been capped 12 times and scored 3 goals, the same number of goals he scored in the 2013–14 season. As Guadalajara has never been in the second tier of Mexican football is struggling to avoid relegation, but still in hopes of fighting for the first positions, Fierro has stated his intent of consolidating himself as a starter for the club and taking that next step. Fierro has stated the support and guidance club legendary player Omar Bravo and Aldo de Nigris have shown him since his return to Guadalajara, even if it requires yelling and scolding.

On 7 September, Fierro scored a duet of goals against U de G in a 3–0 home win at Estadio Omnilife, scoring his first two goals of the season.

Loan at Querétaro
On 2 December 2015, Querétaro F.C. announced they had signed Fierro on a loan deal with the option of purchase. He made his official debut as a starter on 8 January 2016 at home against Atlas. He scored his first goal on 22 January 2016 in a home match against Sinaloa.

Return to Guadalajara
Fierro returned to the club for the 2017 season. After a year long loan to Querétaro he made his return on January 7, 2017, as a sub  against Pumas UNAM in a 2–1 victory.

Cruz Azul
On 8 December 2018, Cruz Azul announced the signing of Fierro for a fee of $3 million USD, about $55 million MXN.

San Jose Earthquakes
On 25 June 2019, San Jose Earthquakes acquired Fierro from Cruz Azul for an undisclosed fee, the club announced Tuesday. He spent 2018/19 on loan with Morelia. Fierro, 24, played under Quakes head coach Matias Almeyda when the pair were at Chivas de Guadalajara, winning the 2015 Copa MX and the 2017 Clausura Liga MX title. The winger had his best form with Chivas, scoring 17 goals and adding 17 assists in 185 appearances. Following the 2021 season, San Jose declined their contract option on Fierro.

Style of Play
Fierro is known for his ability to become unmarked, and quickly mobile with the ball. While in play with or without the ball and having a decent shot with his right leg. He is also known for his fight, honor, intelligence and recovery of the ball while playing a defensive role. Most notably he is known for the decent technique when connecting the ball with the head also possessing good control while receiving the long through balls.

Personal life
Fierro's older brother Gustavo Iván Fierro Guerrero was diagnosed with cancer in late 2008, Gustavo fought a battle against cancer for nearly 4 years. Exactly 2 months after Carlos and Mexico won the U-17 World Cup, Gustavo died in the Hospital Country 2011 of Guadalajara, Jalisco at the age of 22.

International career
Fierro was a major key to the national team that won the U-17 World Cup in 2011. He scored his team's first goal in the tournament against North Korea. Fierro was one of the most important players for his team, scoring in the round of 16 and quarterfinals of the tournament. He was awarded the Adidas Bronze Ball for his exceptional performance at the end of the tournament. He dedicated every goal to his brother Gustavo who was diagnosed with cancer in late 2008.

Career statistics

1 Includes 2017 Campeón de Campeones and MLS Cup Playoffs matches.

Honours
Guadalajara
Liga MX: Clausura 2017
Copa MX: Apertura 2015, Clausura 2017

Querétaro
Copa MX: Apertura 2016

Mexico Youth
FIFA U-17 World Cup: 2011
CONCACAF U-20 Championship:  2013

Individual
FIFA U-17 World Cup Bronze Ball: 2011

References

External links
 
 
 Carlos Fierro at Chivas de Corazon 
 Carlos Fierro at ESPN Deportes 
 
 
 
 

1994 births
Living people
People from Ahome Municipality
Footballers from Sinaloa
Association football wingers
Mexican footballers
Mexico youth international footballers
C.D. Guadalajara footballers
Querétaro F.C. footballers
Cruz Azul footballers
Atlético Morelia players
San Jose Earthquakes players
Liga MX players
Mexican expatriate footballers
Expatriate soccer players in the United States
Major League Soccer players